The Kurier Warszawski (or Warsaw Courier) was a daily newspaper printed in Warsaw, Poland from 1821 to 1939, with two editions daily from 1873. It was selling 4,000 copies in 1868, and over 20,000 copies after 1883.

See also
Nowy Kurier Warszawski

References

1821 establishments in Poland
1939 disestablishments in Poland
Defunct newspapers published in Poland
Newspapers published in Warsaw
Polish-language newspapers
Publications established in 1821
Publications disestablished in 1939
Daily newspapers published in Poland